Nelson William Wolff (born October 27, 1940) is a retired American judge and Democratic
politician from San Antonio, Texas. He represented Bexar County in the Texas House of Representatives from 1971 to 1973 and the Texas Senate from 1973 to 1975. He served on the San Antonio City Council from 1987 to 1991 and then as mayor of San Antonio from 1991 to 1995. He served as Bexar county judge from 2001 until December 31, 2022.

Early life and education 
Wolff was born and raised in San Antonio. He earned a Bachelor of Business administration from St. Mary's University and a Juris Doctor from the St. Mary's University School of Law.

Career

Wolff is only the second person to serve as both San Antonio mayor and county judge of Bexar County. (The first was Bryan Callaghan, Jr., who became mayor in 1885 and county judge in 1892.)

With his late father and two brothers, he owned several businesses, most notably Sun Harvest Farms grocery stores and Green Fields Market, a health foods and organic grocery store in San Antonio, which Wolff sold in 2011.

Wolff has penned four books. In Challenge of Change, he describes his experience in the Texas legislature and his participation in the 1974 Constitutional Convention, of which he was instrumental in bringing about. In Baseball for Real Men, Wolff reflects on life and his love of the game. Mayor is a memoir of San Antonio politics focusing on his time in City Hall. In Transforming San Antonio (Trinity University Press) Wolff gives an insider's view on signature economic-development projects with which he was involved: the AT&T Center, a Toyota factory, the PGA Village, and the extension of the San Antonio River Walk.

Wolff was initially appointed to this current position in 2001 to succeed Cyndi Taylor Krier, a Republican, who resigned to accept an appointment from then Governor Rick Perry as a regent of the University of Texas System. Wolff has since been elected to this position three times. In January 2012, he announced that he would seek a fourth full term in 2014. He defeated in the general election the Republican candidate, Carlton L. Soules, a former member of the San Antonio City Council from the North Side. Known as a "budget hawk" while on the council, Soules since entered into an alliance with the unsuccessful 2017 San Antonio mayoral candidate Manuel Medina, the chairman of the Bexar County Democratic Party organization. The two had opposed a defunct a downtown street car project, which they considered a "boondoggle."

Wolff won re-election as county judge in the general election held on November 6, 2018. He defeated the Republican nominee, Probate Judge Tom Rickhoff.

Personal life 
Since 1989, Wolff has been married to his second spouse, the former Tracy Hoag. He has four children from the first marriage to Melinda Wolff: Kevin Alan, Lyn Marie, Scott, and Matthew. He has two stepchildren through the second marriage. His oldest son from his first marriage, Kevin Wolff (born c. 1965), a Republican, served with his father on the Bexar County Commissioners' Court as the Precinct three commissioner until 2021. The two disagreed over a downtown streetcar plan favored by the father and adamantly opposed by the son. They agreed on a proposal to build a rail system with the use of eighteen miles of existing Union Pacific track from downtown San Antonio to Leon Springs.

The Nelson W. Wolff Municipal Stadium, home field of the San Antonio Missions located off U.S. Highway 90 near the intersection with State Highway 151, is named in his honor.

References

External links
Judge Nelson Wolff's Campaign Website
Official biography for County Judge Nelson Wolff
Interview with Nelson Wolff, July 29, 1994, University of Texas at San Antonio: Institute of Texan Cultures: Oral History Collections, UA 15.01, University of Texas at San Antonio Libraries Special Collections.

1940 births
Living people
County judges in Texas
Democratic Party Texas state senators
Democratic Party members of the Texas House of Representatives
People from San Antonio
Mayors of San Antonio
San Antonio City Council members
Texas lawyers
Businesspeople from Texas
20th-century American politicians
21st-century American judges